Malia Hosaka (born October 7, 1969) is an American professional wrestler. She is a former NWA World Women's Champion.

Professional wrestling career
Malia Hosaka was trained by Killer Kowalski at the wrestling training camp run by Misty Blue Simmes. In her debut match, Hosaka (wearing a Mary Lou Retton-inspired gymnastics outfit and billed as "Malia Ho") teamed with Simmes against Mad Dog Debbie Irons and Linda Dallas.

Ladies Professional Wrestling Association
In the early 1990s, Hosaka regularly wrestled for the Ladies Professional Wrestling Association. On February 13, 1992, she teamed with Bambi to challenge the LPWA Tag Team Champions The Glamour Girls on the LPWA Super Ladies Showdown pay-per-view. She also competed in the Ladies Major League Wrestling and Women's Pro Wrestling organizations in the early 1990s.

Eastern Championship Wrestling
Hosaka debuted in Eastern Championship Wrestling at NWA Bloodfest on October 1, 1993 and defeated Molly McShane. She then substituted for Madusa at November to Remember on November 13, 1993 and wrestled against Sherri Martel.

Independent circuit and World Championship Wrestling

Hosaka joined World Championship Wrestling in 1996 and competed in their newly formed women's division. She wrestled in the tournament to crown the first WCW Women's Champion, but was eliminated by Zero. During her tenure in WCW, she was managed by Sonny Onoo and frequently wrestled on WCW Monday Nitro and WCW Saturday Night against Madusa, Leilani Kai and WCW Women's Champion Akira Hokuto. In 1997, she competed in the WCW Women's Cruiserweight Championship tournament and was defeated in the finals by Toshie Uematsu. During March 1997, Malia Hosaka wrestled Madusa Miceli. During this memorable match, Madusa became extremely brutal with Malia. She grabbed her by the hair. Then she tossed her around the ring by the hair.

In 1998, Hosaka became a two-time New Dimension Wrestling Women's Champion. She defeated Debbie Combs for the belt on August 7, but lost it to Starla Saxton two weeks later. The next night, Hosaka defeated Saxton to once again become champion. She held the belt for approximately a month and a half until she lost it to The Foxy Lady on November 9, 1998. Hosaka wrestled against Saxton in matches taped for WCW Pro on May 16, 1998 and WCW WorldWide on September 19, 1998 and December 26, 1998.

In 1999, Hosaka took on longtime rival Brandi Alexander in a non-title match in Tulelake, California, for Rob Russen's IWA Florida promotion. She was billed as IWA Women's World Champion, but did not have the belt with her.

World Wrestling Federation
In 1999, Hosaka signed a developmental contract with the World Wrestling Federation. She defeated Brandi Alexander in a dark match on March 29, 1999. She then appeared on the June 28, 1999 edition of Raw Is War as a fan answering Ivory's challenge for her WWF Women's Championship but was instead attacked by Nicole Bass and Ivory until WWF head of security Jim Dotson stopped them. Since she was instantly recognized from her WCW appearances, the proposed "Rocky Balboa" idea for Malia's character fell to the wayside. She also accompanied Taka Michinoku to the ring in his challenge for Dean Malenko's WWF Light Heavyweight Championship, but the storyline was not developed further. WWF kept her under contract for a year, and shortly before her contract expired, they considered bringing her to the main roster under the name "Aphrodisia" and pairing her with soon-to-be debuting talent Essa Rios. Instead, the role was given to Amy Dumas and the character was renamed "Lita". Hosaka was then released due to an internal lack of character idea development.

Total Nonstop Action Wrestling
After being released by the WWF, Hosaka returned to the independent circuit. She was contacted by David McLane to compete in the Women of Wrestling organization, but Hosaka turned down the offer because she felt McLaine was more interested hiring models and training them to act like wrestlers. On June 18, 2003, Hosaka competed in Total Nonstop Action Wrestling and was defeated by Trinity.

Return to the independent circuit
In 2005, Hosaka appeared at "Wrestle Reunion" in an 8-woman tag team match teaming with Wendi Richter, Bambi, and Jenny Taylor against Sherri Martel, Peggy Lee Leather, Krissy Vaine, and Amber O'Neal.

In 2006, Malia became part of the then-fledgling SHIMMER roster. Malia debuted as a villainess in a losing effort against Lorelei Lee on Volume 3. After the match, the evil Malia and Lexie Fyfe attacked Lee in the ring before Cindy Rogers made the save. On Volume 4, Hosaka and Fyfe defeated Lee and Cindy Rogers in a tag team match. During this encounter, Cindy Rogers was wearing spandex tights.  On Volume 5, they became an official team under the name The Experience and would start a winning streak which was broken by Cheerleader Melissa and MsChif on Volume 12. They then started another winning streak which was broken this time by Ashley and Nevaeh in the final of a six-team Gauntlet Match on Volume 21. After missing Volume 23, The Experience came back as part of the Volume 24 as they defeated the team of Rayna Von Tosh and Tenille. Once again, the Experience missed a Volume, but they came back as part of the Volume 26 losing to the team of Nikki Roxx and Ariel. Lexie Fyfe, due to some illness, was not scheduled for the SHIMMER 4th ANNIVERSARY Tapings but Malia was and defeated Tenille, but lost to Ariel in Singles Action.

Malia was also the "Queen of PMA" for Team PMA along with Syren and Evil Zebra.

On July 4, 2009 at the United States Championship Wrestling "Summerbash 2009" show in Macclenny, Florida, Hosaka won the vacant USCW Women's Championship by defeating Amber O' Neal in the finals of the championship tournament match.

On February 17, 2012 via her Facebook she announced her retirement:
"It has been a great 25 years, and I am grateful to all the fans who have supported me thru the years! but I am officially retired from the wrestling industry as of today. Thank you to all who supported/employed and believed in me thru the years!" However, Hosaka would return to the ring the following year for two matches. Hosaka then returned full-time in 2014, becoming SHINE Tag Team Champions with Brandi Wine.

She made a recent appearance on Rocky Mountain Pro's "Charged" program.

Personal life
Hosaka is half Japanese. She graduated Citrus High School in 1989 and later that year briefly attended Central Florida Community College.

Championships and accomplishments
 Cauliflower Alley Club
 Women's Wrestling Award (2015)
International Wrestling Association
IWA Women's Championship (1 time)
National Wrestling Alliance
NWA World Women's Championship (1 time)
New Dimension Wrestling
NDW Women's Championship (2 times)
Pro Wrestling Illustrated
Ranked No. 35 of the best 50 female singles wrestlers in the PWI Female 50 in 2008.
Shine Wrestling
Shine Tag Team Championship (1 time) - with Brandi Wine
Tulalip Championship Wrestling
TCW Women's Championship (2 time)
Ultimate Championship Wrestling
UCW Women's Championship (1 time)
United States Championship Wrestling
USCW Women's Championship (1 time)
Women Superstars Uncensored
WSU Hall of Fame (Class of 2009)
World League Wrestling
WLW Ladies Championship (2 times)
Wild Women of Wrestling / Ladies Major League Wrestling
WWOW/LMLW Junior Championship (1 time)

References

External links

Official Website
Official Yahoo Group
Official Yahoo Group for Team PMA
Malia Hosaka interview
Malia Hosaka in LPWA

1969 births
Living people
Sportspeople from Honolulu
American female professional wrestlers
Faux Japanese professional wrestlers
Professional wrestlers from Hawaii
21st-century American women
20th-century professional wrestlers
21st-century professional wrestlers
NWA World Women's Champions